The Scent of Burning Grass is a 2012 Vietnamese drama film directed by Nguyen Huu Muoi. The film was selected as the Vietnamese entry for the Best Foreign Language Oscar at the 85th Academy Awards, but it did not make the final shortlist.

See also
 List of submissions to the 85th Academy Awards for Best Foreign Language Film
 List of Vietnamese submissions for the Academy Award for Best Foreign Language Film

References

External links
 

2012 films
2012 drama films
Vietnamese-language films
Vietnam War films
Vietnamese drama films